Two submarines of the United States Navy have been named USS Bergall for the bergall, a small fish of the New England coast.

 , was a Balao-class submarine that served during World War II, then was sold to Turkey.
 , was a Sturgeon-class submarine that served during the Cold War.

Sources

United States Navy ship names

ja:バーゴール